Manjula Kanwar is an Indian actress known for her work in Odia cinema. She has acted in two films: Bhangala Silata (1998) and Raju Awara (2012). She won the National Film Award for Best Supporting Actress for her performance in Bhangala Silata.

References

External links 
 

Indian film actresses
Actresses in Odia cinema
Best Supporting Actress National Film Award winners
20th-century Indian actresses